John Cone (born November 16, 1974) is an American professional wrestling referee who works for WWE under the Raw brand. Cone also works in the corporate role of senior manager of talent relations for WWE.

Professional wrestling career

Independent circuit (1996–2006) 
Cone started refereeing independent wrestling matches in August 1996.

Personal life
Cone was born in Kansas City, Missouri where he and his wife are owners of a Donut King.

At WrestleMania 34, Cone's 10-year-old son, Nicholas, was “chosen” out of the audience by Braun Strowman to be his tag-team partner to challenge for the WWE Raw Tag Team Championship in a match refereed by Cone. They won their match against The Bar, making Nicholas the youngest champion in any category in WWE history, but they relinquished the title the following night on Raw. In 2019, it was claimed that Nicholas held a red belt in karate.

Filmography

Web series

References

External links
WWE Profile on WWE.com

1974 births
living people
professional wrestling referees
sportspeople from Kansas City, Missouri
WWE executives